Sarakhs (also Romanized as Serakhs) is a city in Sarakhs County, Razavi Khorasan Province, Iran. Sarakhs was once a stopping point along the Silk Road, and in its 11th century heyday had many libraries. Much of the original city site is now just across the border at Serakhs in Turkmenistan.  According to the most recent national census, in 2006, the city's population was 33,571 in 8,066 families.

History 

Several battles were fought in this area. According to Ferdowsi's Shahnameh the town has existed since the Afrasiab period and was named for its builder, Sarakhs, son of Godarz, by Keykavus.  The surrounding oasis has been inhabited since 2nd millennium BCE and Turkmen historians consider the city to have been founded in 507 BCE. Although this is considered to be a somewhat arbitrary choice of date, the section of the city called Sarahs that's now on the Turkmenistan side of the border, duly celebrated its 2500th anniversary in 1993. The Mongols plundered and destroyed Sarakhs in 1221 AD. In the Seljuk Era a famous school of architects was located in Old Sarakhs, and the region retains the tombs of three major 11th-century figures, two on the Turkmenistan side of today's border (those of Abul Fazl, and the 1089 Yarty Gumbez, mausoleum of Sheikh Ahmed Al Khady) and the impressive Tomb of Baba Loghman on the Iranian side. All were significantly rebuilt in the mid-19th century by the order of Nasser-al-Din Shah of the Qajar dynasty, who also rebuilt the current Iranian-side town .

Industries and Mines 
The most important industries in this city are the industries related to the extraction, refining and storage of gas, oil and sulfur resources which is rich. Aq Darband coal mine, which is now inactive after falling and killing and injuring several workers. The sand mines in the area of Qush-e Azim are also operating.

Geography 
Sarakhs weather is cold in winter, warm and dry in summer thanks to the influence of the Karakum Desert.

Sarakhs city, with an area of more than 5,000 square kilometers, is located in the northeast of Khorasan Razavi province, next to the border between Iran and the Republic of Turkmenistan, 180 kilometers east of Mashhad. It is located approximately between the meridians 30 to 60 and 15 to 61 degrees east and between the two orbits 36 and 36 to 40 degrees north. The natural boundary of the region to the south is determined by the Kashfarud River, the eastern boundary by the Tajan River (from the confluence of the Hariroud River and the Kashfar River), and the natural western and southwestern boundaries by the last extensions of the Kopeh Dagh heights. It is bounded on the north and east by the Republic of Turkmenistan, on the west by the city of Mashhad, and on the south by the city of Torbat-e Jam.

The weather in Sarakhs has been mild and dry in the past With the expansion of irrigated agriculture and the intake of “Dousti dam”. And now, during the summer months, even in spring, the maximum temperature is 50 degrees above zero and the lowest in winter is 15 degrees below zero.

Landmarks 

The main historical site of Sarakhs is the partly restored Loghman Baba mausoleum in a field just north of the town.  It was built in 1356AD (757AH).

In Sarakhs district within 80 km of Sarakhs town are: 
 Bazangan lake
 Mazdavand cave and reservoir
 Iran–Turkmenistan Friendship Dam
 Ribat Sharaf Caravanserai
 Khatun Bridge (five-arched stone bridge between Iran and Turkmenistan)
 Tomb of Baba Loghman
Sarakhs Special Economic Zone

Transport 
More than a century after the early proposals of a cross-border railway at this location,
the railways of Iran and Turkmenistan were finally linked here in 1996. A bogie exchange is needed to overcome a break of gauge.  This will be supplemented with a quicker SUW 2000 variable gauge axles track gauge changing facility (TSR).

References 

Populated places in Sarakhs County
Cities in Razavi Khorasan Province
Iran–Turkmenistan border crossings
Nishapur Quarter
Populated places along the Silk Road